Dominique Beillan (born 24 May 1955) is a French former professional tennis player.

Beillan made regular appearance at the French Open through the 1970s and early 1980s. Her best performance were in mixed doubles, reaching the semi-finals twice, with Omar Laimina in 1977 and Patrice Dominguez in 1980. She fell in the first round in both of her two singles main draw appearances, which included a three set loss in 1979 to former finalist Renáta Tomanová.

References

External links
 
 

1955 births
Living people
French female tennis players